The Guianan savanna (NT0707) is an ecoregion in the south of Venezuela, Guyana and Suriname and the north of Brazil. It is in the Amazon biome.
The savanna covers an area of rolling upland plains on the Guiana Shield between the Amazon and Orinoco basins.
It includes forested areas, but these are shrinking steadily due to the effect of frequent fires, either accidental or deliberate.
The ecoregion includes the Gran Sabana region of Venezuela.

Location

The ecoregion includes three large unconnected areas totaling .
The main section is in southeast Venezuela, the Brazilian state of Roraima and western Guyana.
To the southeast a smaller section is in the north of the Brazilian state of Pará extending into the south of Suriname.
The most eastern and smallest section is in the Brazilian state of Amapá, stretching north from Macapá.
There are small isolated fragments to the north of the main section in the Pakarima foothills in Guyana.
The main section includes the Gran Sabana region of Venezuela.

All three sections adjoin the Uatuma-Trombetas moist forests ecoregion to the south.
The most eastern section adjoins the Marajó várzea to the east, at the mouth of the Amazon River.
The Guianan moist forests ecoregion lies to the east of the main section and to the north of the other two sections.
The main section adjoins the Guianan piedmont and lowland moist forests ecoregion to the west.
The northern part of the main section adjoins areas of the Guianan Highlands moist forest and Pantepuis ecoregions.

Physical
The grasslands are between the basins of the Amazon and Orinoco rivers.
This ecoregion covers gently rolling upland plains of the Roraima formation, sediments that overlay the ancient Guiana Shield basement from the Precambrian era.
Soils are typically highly weathered oxisols that are low in organic matter and nutrients and often high in toxic compounds of aluminum.
The north part of the main section of the ecoregion is in the eastern Orinoco basin, and is drained by the upper Caroní River, known as the Kuquenán, the Yuruaní River and the Arabopó River. The south and east parts of the main section are in the Branco River basin. 
The rivers are blackwater rivers, acidic and very low in nutrients.

Climate

The Köppen climate classification is "Am": equatorial, monsoonal.
Temperatures are relatively stable throughout the year, slightly cooler in July and slightly warmer in November.
There are NE and SE trade winds during most of the year.
Relative air humidity is generally high, with mean annual levels of 75–85%.

Ecology

The Guianan savanna ecoregion is in the Neotropical realm and the tropical and subtropical grasslands, savannas, and shrublands biome.

Flora

The Guianan savanna ecoregion contains relatively intact grasslands within an area of tropical rainforest and sandstone tepuis.
The Guianan savanna contains the Gran Sabana mosaic of grasslands and tree patches.
There are continuous forests at the base of the tepuis, and patches of forest or of shrubs in other places surrounded by broad areas of grassland that are usually free of shrubs or trees.
Some areas have shrubby meadows.
The streams that cross the region run through gallery forests.
There is a low level of endemism compared to the Guianan Tepuis.
However, the ecoregion is important as a plant refuge and center for plant dispersal.
204 species have been recorded in the Venezuelan Sierra de Lema and Cerro Venamo, including endemic species in swamps in the open savanna, on dry rocky land and in the forests at different levels.

Common species in the scrublands are Euphorbia guianensis, Humiria balsamifera, Clusia species Calliandra species Chamaecrista species, Bonnetia sessilis, Myrcia species, and Ternstroemia pungens. 
Common species in the open savannas are Axonopus pruinosus, Axonopus kaietukensis, Trachypogon plumosus, Echinolaena inflexa, Bulbostylis paradoxa, Rhynchospora globosa and Hypolytrum pulchrum. 
Common species in the palm savannas are Hypogynium virgatum, Andropogon species, Panicum species, Byttneria genistella, Miconia stephananthera, Mahurea exstiputata and Mauritia flexuosa. 
Common species in the meadows are Chalepophyllum guianense, Digomphia laurifolia, Tococa nitens and Poecilandra retusa.

Fauna

Most of the endemic birds of the Guianan highland or found on the Gran Sabana.
These are mostly found in the humid forest on the foothills above .
They include the tepui swift (Streptoprocne phelpsi), tepui goldenthroat (Polytmus milleri) and tepui wren (Troglodytes rufulus).
Endangered birds include the sun parakeet (Aratinga solstitialis), Rio Branco antbird (Cercomacra carbonaria), yellow-bellied seedeater (Sporophila nigricollis) and hoary-throated spinetail (Synallaxis kollari).

Endangered mammals include the black bearded saki (Chiropotes satanas) and giant otter (Pteronura brasiliensis).
There are relatively few endemic frogs when compared to the tepuis.
Most endemic species are found in the La Escalera forest, and include Anomaloglossus parkerae, Stefania scalae, Scinax danae, Tepuihyla rodriguezi, and Pristimantis pulvinatus. 
Rodriguez's Amazon tree frog (Tepuihyla rodriguezi) is found in savannas and some tepuis. 
Scinax exiguus and Leptodactylus sabanensis are found only in savannas.

Status

The World Wildlife Fund gives the ecoregion the status of "Vulnerable".
The savanna is replacing the forests as a result of frequent fires and the poor soils.
This is causing some of the small streams to become intermittent in the dry season, affecting the amphibians.
The smoke from the fires may be creating a greenhouse effect, intensifying the heat and damage caused by the fires.
Gold and diamond mining cause mercury pollution.

50.35% of the ecoregion is in protected areas. The Venezuelan Gran Sabana is contained in the  Canaima National Park.
Other parts of the ecoregion are protected by the  Monte Roraima National Park in Brazil and the Tumucumaque Mountains National Park.
The Sipaliwini Savanna in Suriname borders and is an extension of the Tumucumaque National Park. It is a  protected area since 1972. The  Rupununi savannah in Guyana does not have an official protected area status as of 2020.

Notes

Sources

Neotropical ecoregions
Ecoregions of Brazil
Ecoregions of Guyana
Ecoregions of Suriname
Ecoregions of Venezuela
Amazon biome